Stellaria borealis is a species of flowering plant in the family Caryophyllaceae known by the common name boreal starwort. It has a circumboreal distribution, occurring throughout northern areas of the Northern Hemisphere. It occurs in many types of moist and wet habitat, including marshes, riverbanks, lakesides, floodplains, talus, ditches, and moist spots in forests and woodlands. It is quite variable in appearance, especially across subspecies. In general, it is a rhizomatous perennial herb forming mats of branching, four-angled stems lined with lance-shaped leaves a few centimeters in length. The inflorescence bears many flowers each with five deeply lobed white petals. Some flowers lack petals and have only the five pointed green sepals.

This plant is sometimes infected with the smut fungus Microbotryum violaceum (Microbotyrum stellariae), which causes its anthers to turn red.

References

External links
Jepson Manual Treatment: ssp. sitchana
Photo gallery

borealis
Flora of Subarctic America
Flora of Canada
Flora of the Northeastern United States
Flora of the North-Central United States
Flora of the Northwestern United States
Flora of the Southwestern United States
Flora without expected TNC conservation status